Witness to War: Dr. Charlie Clements is a 1985 American short documentary film directed by Deborah Shaffer and starring Charlie Clements. Produced by David H. Goodman, it won an Oscar for Documentary Short Subject at the 58th Academy Awards, held in 1986.

Cast
 Charlie Clements as Himself (as Dr. Charlie Clements)
 Richard Nixon as Himself (archive footage)

References

External links
Witness to War: Dr. Charlie Clements at Skylight Pictures

1985 films
1985 documentary films
1985 short films
American short documentary films
American independent films
1980s short documentary films
Best Documentary Short Subject Academy Award winners
Documentary films about health care
Documentary films about the Salvadoran Civil War
Documentary films about veterans
Films about activists
1985 independent films
1980s English-language films
1980s American films